Sarojini Nagar is a neighbourhood in South West Delhi district of Delhi, India.   It was one of the sites of the 29 October 2005 Delhi bombings.  It is close to Safdarjung Airport, starting 2010, it is serviced by the Sarojini Nagar on the newly constructed underground station on the Pink Line of Delhi Metro.

Overview

Prior to the adoption of the name, Sarojini Nagar was called Vinay Nagar and also Beena Nagar, Laxmi Bai Nagar was called East Vinay Nagar and Netaji Nagar was called West Vinay Nagar. Named after the famous woman freedom fighter Sarojini Naidu, this colony is encircled by Safdarjung Enclave, South Extension, Laxmibai Nagar, Nauroji Nagar, Chanakyapuri and Netaji Nagar.  It is in the vicinity of Chanakyapuri which is home to various embassies and consulates, including those of the United States and Russia.

Essentially located in the South West Delhi locality of the city, Sarojini Nagar (or SN as it is sometimes called) is one of the places in the city to buy clothes and fabrics. Apart from a large number of large-sized showrooms for various international and local brands, the crux of the market is formed by street-side shops that sell garments of all sizes, designs and colours. It becomes extremely crowded on weekends.

Sarojini Nagar was in the international news when a small shop was destroyed (and has since been rebuilt) in the Diwali Delhi blasts on 29/10/05 Delhi bombings.

The market which is surrounded by government housing has the following sections, as locals call them. 90% of the shops in SN are family-owned.

Babu Market is located at the north-west corner of Sarojini Nagar Market. It has four rows of enclosed shops facing each other. Most of the shops are garment and clothes shops. The first shop on the corner of Sarojini Nagar which faces the north-east of Babu Market is Mahindra Sweets. This shop is outside the enclosed area of Babu Market. More famously known as Mucchal Halwayi ki Dukaan. A name was given to this shop because its owner had big moustaches. After his demise, his children have taken over the business. On rainy days or during evenings crowds line up in front of this shop to buy hot Samosas and Jalebi. This shop is followed by steel utensil shops which draw large crowds during Dhanteras.

On the north-west corner of the market, the first shop is a shoe shop. This used to be a bakery and general store till the early 1990s. Most of the shops that are enclosed in rows facing each other are garment shops. Shopping here becomes a challenge during the Summertime when temperatures get into 45 to 48 °C (116 °F). G, H, and I are the nearest Residential block to Babu Market. During evenings, the section of the market that faces the central market lights up with hundreds of street vendors, popcorn vendors, and other small street sellers who usually carry a small kerosene gas lamp on their carts. There is also a CGHS dispensary just opposite to Babpu Market where government employees can get a free checkup from a 24-hour available doctor. Like any other section of the market, parking is a big problem in Babu Market, especially during the evenings.

The far south end of the Sarojini Nagar market is Subzi Market. Subzi is the common Hindi word for vegetables in North India. This Subzi market is known for its fresh vegetables in South West Delhi.  The vegetable vendors shout at the top of their voice to attract customers to their stalls.  Some of these vendors get creative with the calls and rhyme them in a comic way.

Subzi market is also the best place to get the freshest fruits in South West Delhi at a reasonable price.  Customers can bargain with vendors when buying large quantities of fruits or vegetables.  There is a parking lot right behind the market facing the Government Girls Senior Secondary School No. 1.

Facing Subzi market is a section of Central Market. Till the early 1990s the corner-most shop of the western end of this market used to be a Sweets Shop. After the father’s demise, the younger generation converted this into a garment shop. Right outside this shop, however, a traditional Tikki and Kulfi vendor continues to sell Tikki and Kulfi.
The large central market is shaped like a horizontally extended "I" or "][". The layout of the market is unique wherein visitors move around in a circle without realizing so. People who get lost sometimes find it hard to believe that by keeping going on they will reach the starting point of their trip. Shops are lined up in rows and there is a newly constructed open-air path-way in front of the shops for customers to move through the crowds to get into each shop.  These pathways are also largely occupied by illegal street vendors. Shops have a front opening and a back opening. The back-streets (galiyan) of SN market are just as crowded and busy as the path-ways in front of the shops. On one side of the central market, there are bakery shops.

The export lane compromises of great bags store which keeps all kind of leather and non-leather bags.

The North side of the central SN market mostly has footwear shops. There are also a few leather belt vendors who occupy the space near the large arches where you may still see the decades-old sign "SAROJINI NAGAR". Some of the letters in this sign were already missing and maybe as it stands today, these letters may not even be there.

Sarojini Nagar was also a hotbed of BJP, RSS and VHP activities. The annual Dussehra festival is still celebrated with the nine days of Ram-Lila followed by Ravan Dahan. In early 1980s and 1990s RSS Svayam Sevaks (activists) could be seen holding Shakhas (daily gatherings) in their uniquely recognizable short-pants and white shirts.  Some of the parks in the surrounding area are named after freedom fighters and religious leaders such as Swami Vivekanand Park. In the late 1970s or 1980s, this park was also called the Fountain Garden or (Hindi: Fuarey wala park), since it had water fountains and lights that would attract local visitors and kids during evening hours. The park got renovated and landscaped around 2007 and provides respite to tired shopaholics/joggers/residents.

The Sarojini Market remains closed on Mondays. Sarojini Nagar Market opens up around 11 A.M. and shut down around 8 or 9 P.M.

Sarojini Nagar is a place that is located in the south-west district of Delhi state in India.

Known for its Delhi Development Authority (DDA) flats and also, as a shopping paradise for many, Sarojini Nagar will soon be known for a revamped look, too. The locality is among the few old localities of South Delhi that are undergoing redevelopment plan set by the National Building Construction Company (NBCC) and the Ministry of Urban Development (MoUD). The colony will be redeveloped with a modernised residential building designed in compliance with the fire safety standards, green norms and utilising maximum land resources.

References

Neighbourhoods in Delhi
South West Delhi district
Shopping districts and streets in India